Tippecanoe Township is one of twelve townships in Pulaski County, Indiana, United States. As of the 2010 census, its population was 1,104 and it contained 580 housing units.

Tippecanoe Township was organized in 1839, and named after the Tippecanoe River.

Geography

Cities, towns, villages
 Monterey

Unincorporated towns
 Lawton at 
 Vanmeter Park at 
(This list is based on USGS data and may include former settlements.)

Adjacent townships
 North Bend Township, Starke County (north)
 Union Township, Marshall County (northeast)
 Aubbeenaubbee Township, Fulton County (east)
 Harrison Township (south)
 Monroe Township (southwest)
 Franklin Township (west)
 California Township, Starke County (northwest)

Lakes
 Langenbaum Lake

Landmarks
 Beason Park
 Tippecanoe River State Park (partial)

Education
 Culver Community Schools Corporation

Tippecanoe Township residents are served by the Monterey-Tippecanoe Township Public Library.

Political districts
 Indiana's 2nd congressional district
 State House District 20
 State Senate District 18

References
 United States Census Bureau 2008 TIGER/Line Shapefiles
 United States Board on Geographic Names (GNIS)
 IndianaMap

External links

Townships in Pulaski County, Indiana
Townships in Indiana